Da Vinci's Challenge is a board game distributed by Briarpatch.

Background

Da Vinci's Challenge is a game of patterns inspired by a geometric construction drawn by Leonardo da Vinci. The player's objective is to score the most points by using pieces to create patterns worth different point values. This is complicated because patterns can overlap. Pieces can also be used to block the opponent from creating patterns. The game ends when no more patterns can be made by either side. The player with the highest score is the winner.

Awards
It won a 2005 Mensa Select Award.

References

External links
 Description of the game by the manufacturer (retrieved January 16, 2014)
 Boardgame Geek page

Board games introduced in 2004
Abstract strategy games
Mensa Select winners